Sacred Heart High School was a private, Roman Catholic high school located in the downtown district in the city of Waterbury, Connecticut. It was in the jurisdiction of the Roman Catholic Archdiocese of Hartford.

Background
Sacred Heart was established in 1922 as an all-girls school.  The school became coeducational in 1938.  Since 1975, the school has been located in the old Waterbury Catholic High School building in downtown Waterbury.

Closure
On February 11, 2021, Sacred Heart announced it would be closing at the end of the 2020–2021 school year. The school's president said it was in part due to declining enrollment at the school.

Athletics

Conferences

 Part of the Naugatuck Valley League (NVL)
 Part of the Connecticut Interscholastic Athletic Conference (CIAC)

Notable alumni

 Gary Franks, former Republican U.S. representative of the fifth congressional district.
 Mustapha Heron, professional basketball player
 Ron Diorio, Major League baseball pitcher for Philadelphia Phillies 1973-1974.
  Dave Wallace, Major League Baseball pitching coach, and a former general manager and player
 Christopher Evans, French-American graphic designer and illustrator, well known in France
 John Gereski, adjutant general of the Connecticut National Guard

References

External links
 School Website
 Roman Catholic Archdiocese of Hartford

Schools in Waterbury, Connecticut
Catholic secondary schools in Connecticut
Educational institutions established in 1922
Educational institutions disestablished in 2021
1922 establishments in Connecticut
2021 disestablishments in Connecticut